The Longwood Range is a range of hills to the west of the Southland Plains, Southland, New Zealand. From the 1860s until the 1950s gold mining was prevalent in the Longwood Ranges. There are many small towns and localities situated around the periphery of these hills: clockwise from the south-east, these include Riverton, Pourakino Valley, Colac Bay, Pahia, Orepuki, Tuatapere, Otautau and Thornbury. 

The highest point of the range is Bald Hill, west of Otautau, and is used for a cellphone tower.

References 

Hills of Southland, New Zealand